Oļegs un Aina (1973) is a Latvian SSR television feature film. The film was directed by Aleksandrs Leimanis.

Cast
Anatolijs Gračovs — Oļeg
Lilita Ozoliņa — Aina
Rolands Zagorskis — Andris
Aleksandrs Bojarskis — Žarkovskis
Velta Līne — Oļeg’s mother
Uldis Dumpis — Eduards
Jānis Grantiņš — Pēteris
Elza Radziņa — Aina’s mother

References 

Soviet-era Latvian films